Pudipeddi Sai Kumar (born 27 July 1960) is an Indian actor, dubbing artist and television presenter who works predominantly in  Telugu, Kannada, in addition to a few Tamil films.

He has received three state Filmfare Awards South, two Nandi Awards and two SIMA Awards for his work in Telugu and Kannada. His performance in Prasthanam (2010) featured in the list of the "100 Greatest Performances of the Decade" by Film Companion.

Early and personal life
Sai Kumar was born to P. J. Sarma and Krishna Jyothi, as one of five children. Sarma moved from Vizianagaram, Andhra Pradesh to Chennai and established himself as an actor and dubbing artist while Jyothi, hails from Bagepalli, Karnataka and has acted in several Kannada films.

Kumar's brothers P. Ravi Shankar and Ayyappa Sharma are also actors. They have two sisters. Kumar has a master's degree in Arts from Presidency College, Chennai and completed M.Phil. at Madras Christian College, where he also taught briefly.

Sai Kumar's son Aadi is an actor in Telugu cinema.

Film career
He started his career at an early age as a dubbing child artist. His father, P. J. Sarma was a leading dubbing artist. Sai Kumar followed in his father's footsteps, having dubbed for Suman and Rajasekhar for many of their films. As a child actor, he appeared in Devudu Chesina Pelli (1975) and Sneham (1977). He resumed acting as an adult, appearing in Challenge (1984), Kalikalam (1991), Major Chandrakanth (1993) and others.

He started in Tamil movies like Thaiyalkaran (1991), Kaaval Geetham (1992), Vaettiya Madichu Kattu (1998) and then the action roles such as Aathi (2006), Thenavattu (2008) and Thiruvannamalai (2008).

He appeared in the 1996 Kannada film Police Story, which was also voice dubbed in Telugu and Tamil. His Kannada films Agni IPS (1997), Central Jail (1997), Police Story 2 (2007) were all major hits at the box office and Sai Kumar became a household name in Karnataka. Sai Kumar says, 'I am indebted to Karnataka for making me a star and giving me Police Story during my struggling days.' His Kannada film RangiTaranga was one of the  300 films eligible to be nominated for the Oscars in 2016 and his performance in the film was not only praised by the critics, but also earned him an IIFA Utsavam and SIIMA Award.

Television career 
In addition to his films, he also hosted Deal or No Deal on Gemini TV and Etv Kannada in Telugu and Kannada respectively. He also hosted WOW-Sakkhath Kick Kodo game show on ETV Kannada and WOW S1 - Manchi Kick Ichche, WOW S2 game shows on ETV. He hosted a game show, Manam on ETV.

Awards

Nandi Awards
 Nandi Award for Best Villain  – Samanyudu (2006)
 Nandi Award for Best Supporting Actor – Prasthanam (2010)

Filmfare Awards
 Filmfare Award for Best Supporting Actor – Telugu - Samanyudu (2006)
 Filmfare Award for Best Supporting Actor – Telugu - Prasthanam (2010)
 Filmfare Award for Best Supporting Actor – Kannada - RangiTaranga (2015)

IIFA Awards
 IIFA Award for Best Supporting Actor (Kannada)  – RangiTaranga (2015)

CineMAA Awards
 CineMAA Award for Best Supporting Actor – Prasthanam (2010)

SIMA Awards

 SIMA Award for Best Actor in a Negative Role – Bharaate (2019)
 SIMA Award for Best Actor in a Negative Role – RangiTaranga (2015)

Other Awards
 TSR – TV9 Award for Best Villain (2010) - Prasthanam
Santosham Best Villain Award – Yevadu (2014)

Television Awards (As anchor)
 TV Award 2009 for Best Male Anchor presented by Delhi Telugu Academy in Hyderabad on 8 August 2010.
 Tata Docomo Media Award – Most Popular Male Anchor was given on 15 August 2010 for anchoring the TV show Wow on ETV Telugu.
 'Best Male Anchor Award' was presented at the AP Cinegoers' 6th Annual TV Awards – 2009 on 28 December 2010 for his anchoring of Wow on ETV Telugu.

Filmography

As actor

Telugu

Kannada

 Prema Sangama (1992)
 Kumkuma Bhagya (1993)
 Lockup Death (1994)
 Hettha Karulu (1994)
 Muthinantha Hendathi (1995)
 Thavaru Beegaru (1995)
 Thaliya Sowbhagya (1995)
 Puttmalli (1995)
 Emergency (1995)
 Hetthavaru (1996)
 Circle Inspector (1996)
 Saakida Gini (1996)
 Sowbhagya Devathe (1996)
 Mane Mane Ramayana (1996)
 Aayudha (1996)
 Police Story (1996)
 Muddina Kanmani (1997)
 Agni IPS (1997)
 Police Bete (1997)
 Central Jail (1997)
 Dhairya (1997)
 Jagadeeshwari (1998)
 Underworld (1999)
 Om Namah Shivaya (1999)
 Naga Devathe (2000)
 Mahatma (2000)
 Ticket Tickets (2000)
 Paapigala Lokadalli (2000)
 Durgada Huli (2000)
 Independence Day (2000)
 Khadga (2000)
 Rashtra Geethe (2001)
 Grama Devathe (2001)
 Law and Order (2002)
 Anka (2003)
 Vijaya Dashami (2003)
 Monda (2004)
 The City (2004)
 Srirampura Police Station (2004)
 Bhagawan (2004)
 Mahasadhvi Mallamma (2005)
 Police Story 2 (2007)
 Rakshaka (2007)
 Sri Kshetra Kaivara Thathaiyya (2007)
 Citizen (2008)
 Aa Marma (2012)
 Kalpana (2012)
 Angulimala (2012)
 Samsaradalli Golmal (2012)
 Brindavana (2013)
 Angulimala (2014)
 Rose (2014)
 RangiTaranga (2015)
 Raj Bahaddur (2016)
 Mahaveera Machideva (2016)
 Run Antony (2016) - Special appearance
 Madamakki (2016)
 Nagarahavu (2016)
 Santhu Straight Forward (2016)
 Real Police (2017)
 Pataki (2017)
 Happy New Year (2017)
 Bharjari (2017)
 Women's Day (2017)
 Brihaspathi (2018)
 Kismath (2018) - guest appearance
 Ibbaru BTech Students Journey (2019)
 Yada Yada Hi Dharmasya  (2019)
 Bharaate (2019)
 Yuvarathnaa (2021) as Raghav Reddy, Central Education Minister
 Avatara Purusha (2022) as Rama Joyeesa 
 Ombattane Dikku (2022) as Varadappa

Tamil

 Thaiyalkaran (1991)
 Kaaval Geetham (1992)
 Vaettiya Madichu Kattu (1998)
 Anthapuram (1999)
 Aathi (2006)
 Thenavattu (2008)
 Thiruvannamalai (2008)
 Kotti (2010)
 Irumbukkottai Murattu Singam (2010)
 A1 (2019)
 Anbarivu (2022)
 Vaathi (2023)
 Bagheera (2023)
 Diesel (2023)

As dubbing artist

As producer
 Garam

References

External links
 

Telugu male actors
Indian male voice actors
Male actors in Kannada cinema
Indian male child actors
Living people
Filmfare Awards South winners
Nandi Award winners
Male actors in Telugu cinema
Indian male film actors
Male actors in Tamil cinema
People from Vizianagaram
20th-century Indian male actors
21st-century Indian male actors
Telugu film producers
Film producers from Andhra Pradesh
Male actors from Andhra Pradesh
Recipients of the Rajyotsava Award 2008
Santosham Film Awards winners
1961 births